Thondavada is a outgrowth village of Tirupati City. It is situated in Tirupati district of the Indian state of Andhra Pradesh. It is a part of Tirupati urban agglomeration and located in Chandragiri mandal. It falls in the jurisdictional limit of Tirupati Urban Development Authority.

References

Tirupati
Villages in Tirupati district